Kirsten Elise Myklevoll (25 September 1928 – 11 December 1996) was a Norwegian politician for the Labour Party. She was Minister of Administration and Consumer Affairs 1978–1979. She was a member of the Parliament of Norway for Troms 1973–81 and county mayor of Troms 1986–91.

References 

1928 births
1996 deaths
Government ministers of Norway
Members of the Storting
Labour Party (Norway) politicians
20th-century Norwegian politicians